Everything Not Saved Will Be Lost World Tour is a tour by British indie rock band Foals in support of the band's two-part album Everything Not Saved Will Be Lost. The tour started on 4 March 2019 and concluded on 30 August 2021. The tour is the band's first in two years following the release of their 2015 album What Went Down as well as the first tour following the exit of bassist Walter Gervers.

Background
Following a handful of performances in 2017, including a headline performance at the 2017 "Citadel Festival" in London's Gunnersbury Park, the band took a break to work on their fifth album. In January 2018, bassist Walter Gervers announced that he would be leaving the band.

In January 2019, the band announced the release of two albums Everything Not Saved Will Be Lost – Part 1 & Everything Not Saved Will Be Lost – Part 2 alongside dates across USA & Europe as well as the release of their first single in three years, "Exits". The following month Everything Everything bassist Jeremy Pritchard was announced as the band's touring bassist across their 2019 dates alongside touring percussionists Kit Monteith from the band Trophy Wife and Vincent Taeger.

In October 2019, shortly before the release of Everything Not Saved Will Be Lost – Part 2, the band announced a documentary entitled Rip Up The Road for Amazon Studios recorded across the 2019 live dates, as well as releasing a live EP featuring recordings from the band's two headline performances at London's Alexandra Palace.

Due to the COVID-19 pandemic, Foals rescheduled their remaining tour dates in April 2020. Ten months later, in March 2021, they were rescheduled to April 2022. A few days before the tour started, it was rebranded to the Life Is Yours Tour.

Set list
This set list is representative of the performance on 22 June 2019 in London, England. It does not represent the set list at all concerts for the duration of the tour.

"On the Luna"
"Mountain at My Gates"
"Snake Oil"
"Olympic Airways"
"My Number"
"Black Gold"
"Sunday"
"Syrups"
"Providence"
"Spanish Sahara"
"Red Socks Pugie"
"Exits"
"In Degrees"
"White Onions"
"Inhaler"
Encore
"Black Bull"
"What Went Down"
"Two Steps Twice"

Tour dates

Cancelled shows

Notes

References

2019 concert tours
2020 concert tours
2021 concert tours
2022 concert tours
Concert tours postponed due to the COVID-19 pandemic